Mall is a village on the border of Nalgonda and Ranga Reddy districts in Telangana, India. It falls under Chinthapally and Yacharam mandals, respectively.

References

Villages in Nalgonda district
Villages in Ranga Reddy district